The Pacific Coast Interscholastic Sailing Association fosters high school sailing for the California Coast and Hawaii.

The high school sailing season traditionally begins with the Sea Otter Regatta in October and for most ends with the PCCs in April.  Typical fleet racing is sailed in small dinghies called CFJs, although some specialty regattas are held in Lasers.

External links
 Official Website

Yachting associations in the United States
Sailing associations